11β-Methyl-19-nortestosterone 17β-dodecylcarbonate (11β-MNTDC) (developmental code name CDB-4754) is a synthetic and orally active anabolic–androgenic steroid (AAS) and a derivative of nandrolone (19-nortestosterone) which was developed by the Contraceptive Development Branch (CDB) of the National Institute of Child Health and Human Development (NICHD) and has not been marketed for medical use at this time. It is an androgen ester – specifically, the C17β dodecylcarbonate ester of 11β-methyl-19-nortestosterone (11β-MNT) – and acts as a prodrug of 11β-MNT in the body.

11β-MNTDC is under development as a birth control pill for men. It has been described as the "sister compound" of dimethandrolone undecanoate, which is also under development as a birth control pill for men.

Because 11β-MNTDC is not 5α-reduced, in contrast to testosterone, it may have less risk of scalp hair loss.

See also
 List of androgen esters § Esters of other synthetic AAS
 List of investigational sex-hormonal agents § Androgenics

References

Androgen esters
Androgens and anabolic steroids
Contraception for males
Dodecylcarbonate esters
Estranes
Enones
Prodrugs
Progestogens